The 2021–22 Tanzanian Premier League (known as the NBC Premier League for sponsorship reasons) is the 57th season of the Tanzanian Premier League, the top-tier football league in Tanzania (mainland only), since its establishment in 1965. The season started on 27 September 2021. The season ended with Young Africans S.C. clinching their 28th premier league title, winning the entire season undefeated.

League table

Prize Money 
All Teams that participate get a prize money depending on their position in the league.

Relegation play-offs

Semi-finals

First leg

Second leg

References

Tanzanian Premier League
Tanzanian Premier League
Tanzanian Premier League
Tanzania